Iosif Kovács (13 November 1921 – 2003) was a Romanian footballer. He competed in the men's tournament at the 1952 Summer Olympics.

Honours
Locomotiva Timișoara
Cupa României runner-up: 1947–48

Notes

References

External links

1921 births
2003 deaths
Romanian footballers
Romania international footballers
Olympic footballers of Romania
Footballers at the 1952 Summer Olympics
Liga I players
Liga II players
FC Ripensia Timișoara players
FC Carmen București players
FC CFR Timișoara players
Sportspeople from Timișoara
Association football forwards